The Puerto Rico women's national volleyball team is one of the more consistent teams of the NORCECA zone, Puerto Rico has taken one silver and two bronzes on the NORCECA Women's Volleyball Championship, one silver and three bronzes at the Pan-American Cup, and five silvers and one bronze at the Central American and Caribbean Games. The team has participated at least once in all FIVB competitions, except for the World Cup.

Results

Summer Olympics
 Champions   Runners up   Third place   Fourth place

World Championship
 Champions   Runners up   Third place   Fourth place

World Grand Prix
 Champions   Runners up   Third place   Fourth place

Challenger Cup
 Champions   Runners up   Third place   Fourth place

Pan American Cup
 Champions   Runners-up   Third place   Fourth place

Pan American Games
 Champions   Runners up   Third place   Fourth place

Central American & Caribbean Games
 Champions   Runners up   Third place   Fourth place

NORCECA Championship
 Champions   Runners up   Third place   Fourth place

Olympic qualifiers

Team

Current squad
The following is the Puerto Rican roster in the 2018 World Championship.

Head coach: José Mieles
<noinclude>

Former squads
 2002 World Championship — 12th place
Dariam Acevedo, Áurea Cruz, Eva Cruz, Tatiana Encarnación, Lourdes Isern, Dolly Meléndez, Vilmarie Mojica, Xiomara Molero, Karina Ocasio, Yarleen Santiago, and Jetzabel Del Valle. Head coach: David Alemán.
 2004 Olympic Qualifying Tournament — 6th place (did not qualify)
Sarai Álvarez, Michelle Cardona, Áurea Cruz, Eva Cruz, Omayra George, Xiomara Molero, Karina Ocasio, Sheila Ocasio, Alexandra Oquendo, Yarleen Santiago, Shannon Torregrosa, and Shirley Pérez. Head coach: David Alemán.
 2006 Pan-American Cup — 5th place
Sarai Álvarez, Áurea Cruz, Eva Cruz, Tatiana Encarnación, Vilmarie Mojica, Karina Ocasio, Sheila Ocasio, Alexandra Oquendo, Glorimar Ortega, Yarleen Santiago, Shannon Torregrosa, and Jetzabel Del Valle.
 2006 Central American and Caribbean Games —  Bronze Medal
Vilmarie Mojica, Tatiana Encarnación, Yarleen Santiago, Eva Cruz, Áurea Cruz, Vanessa Vélez, Karina Ocasio, Dariam Acevedo, Glorimar Ortega, Shannon Torregrosa, Alexandra Oquendo, and Sheila Ocasio. Head coach: Juan Carlos Núñez.
 2006 World Championship — 16th place
Sarai Álvarez, Áurea Cruz, Eva Cruz, Xaimara Colón, Tatiana Encarnación, Vilmarie Mojica, Karina Ocasio, Sheila Ocasio, Glorimar Ortega, Alexandra Oquendo, Yarleen Santiago, and Jetzabel Del Valle. Head coach: Juan Carlos Núñez.
 2007 Pan American Games — 6th place
Dariam Acevedo, Sarai Álvarez, Áurea Cruz, Eva Cruz, Michelle Cardona, Tatiana Encarnación, Vilmarie Mojica, Karina Ocasio, Sheila Ocasio, Shannon Torregrosa, Deborah Seilhamer, and Vanessa Vélez. Head coach: Juan Carlos Núñez.
 2007 NORCECA Championship — 5th place
Dariam Acevedo, Michelle Cardona, Áurea Cruz (c), Eva Cruz,  Tatiana Encarnación, Wilnelia González, Ana Rosa Luna, Vilmarie Mojica, Sheila Ocasio, Alexandra Oquendo, and Deborah Seilhamer. Head coach: Juan Carlos Núñez.
 2008 Olympic Qualifying Tournament — 8th place (did not qualify)
Sarai Álvarez, Michelle Cardona, Deborah Seilhamer, Xaimara Colón, Vilmarie Mojica (c), Eva Cruz, Áurea Cruz, Karina Ocasio, Ania Ruiz, Shanon Torregrosa, Sheila Ocasio, and Jetzabel Del Valle. Head coach: Juan Carlos Núñez.
 2013 Pan-American Volleyball Cup — 5th place
Yarimar Rosa (c), Karina Ocasio, Sheila Ocasio, Diana Reyes, Lynda Morales, Ania Ruiz, Shara Venegas, Génesis Collazo, Natalia Valentín, Michelle Nogueras, Daly Santana and Pilar M. Victoria. Head coach: Epique Olazagasti.
 2015 Pan-American Games — 4th place
Yarimar Rosa (c), Karina Ocasio, Sheila Ocasio, Lynda Morales, Debora Seilhamer, Vilmarie Mojica, Aurea Cruz, Natalia Valentín, Stephanie Enright, Shirley Ferrer, Nayka Benítez and Alexandra Oquendo. Head coach: José Mieles.

See also

Puerto Rico women's national under-20 volleyball team
Puerto Rico women's national under-18 volleyball team
Dominicana Flight 603 - a 1970 crash where many members of the national team died

References

External links
Federación Puertorriqueña de Voleibol   Official website (Spanish)
FIVB profile

Volleyball
National women's volleyball teams
National